This list of caves in Missouri includes the location and date they were opened to the public (or discovered).

The Ozarks region has a well-developed karst topography with numerous areas of sinkholes, stream capture, and cavern development.

Caves
 Bluff Dweller's Cave (1927) - McDonald County
 Bridal Cave (1948) - Camden County
Crevice Cave - Perry County
 Crystal Cave (1893) 
 Current River Cavern (1940) - Carter County
 Devils Well (1954) - Shannon County
Devil’s Icebox Cave - Boone County
 Fantastic Caverns (1862) - Greene County 
 Friede's Cave (AKA Saltpeter Cave) (before 1865) - Phelps County
 Graham Cave (1847) – Montgomery County
 Jacobs Cavern (1903) - McDonald County
 Mark Twain Cave (1886) - Marion County
 Marvel Cave (1894) - Stone County
 Meramec Caverns (1935) - Franklin County
 Onondaga Cave (1897) - Crawford County
 Onyx Cave (1892) - Pulaski County
 Ozark Caverns (1930s) - Camden County
 Picture Cave - Warren County
 Research Cave (1950) - Callaway County
 Round Spring Cave (1932) - Shannon County
 Riverbluff Cave (2001) - Greene County
 Talking Rocks Cavern (1969) - Stone County

See also
List of caves in the United States
Geography of Missouri#Caves

References 

Missouri